The federal court system of Brazil has all its organs and competences listed and defined in the Brazilian 1988 Constitution. The National Justice Council is an exclusively administrative organ of the federal court system.

Courts
Supreme Federal Court
Superior courts:
Superior Court of Justice
Superior Labor Court
Superior Electoral Court
Superior Military Court
Second instance Courts
Regional Labor Courts
Regional Electoral Courts
Regional Federal Courts
First instance courts:
Labor Courts
Electoral Courts
Federal Courts
Military Courts

See also
 Judiciary of Brazil

Judiciary of Brazil